Sarah, Plain and Tall: Winter's End is a 1999 Hallmark Hall of Fame made-for-television drama film and is the third of three television films based on the series of children's books by Patricia MacLachlan: Sarah, Plain and Tall (1991) and its sequel Skylark (1993).  Though they do not share a title, the events in the film Winter's End are taken from MacLachlan's book Caleb's Story, though in order to appeal to a more adult audience than the children's books the events are expanded and the tone made slightly more serious. The film premiered on CBS on November 21, 1999.

Plot
Sarah and Jacob Witting are on their farm with their family.  Jacob's estranged father John reappears one winter, wanting to make amends with his son.

Cast
 Glenn Close as Sarah Witting - 2nd wife of Jacob, mother of Cassie, and stepmother of Anna and Caleb. She is a loving woman who is surprised at the arrival of her father in law John Witting but tries to help him rebuild his relationship with Jacob.
 Christopher Walken as Jacob Witting - husband of Sarah and Catherine (deceased) father of Anna and Caleb from his 1st marriage to Catherine (deceased) and Cassie from his marriage to Sarah. He is surprised at the arrival of his father John Witting who abandoned him as a child but tries to rebuild a relationship with him though he was hurt by his father's leaving.
 Jack Palance as John Witting - father of Jacob, father-in-law of Sarah, and Catherine (deceased) and grandfather of Anna, Caleb, and Cassie. He abandoned Jacob when he was a child but returns in the movie to rebuild a relationship with his son. He owned the farm Jacob and Sarah live on.
 Emily Osment as Cassie Witting - Jacob's youngest child and Sarah's only child and the younger half-sister of Anna and Caleb. She loves to talk and sometimes gets into mischief. She is the first to discover that her grandfather John Witting had returned.
 Christopher Bell as Caleb Witting - Jacob's middle child and only son (from his 1st wife Catherine). He is the stepson of Sarah, the younger brother of Anna, and the older half-brother of Cassie whom he loves dearly.
 Lexi Randall as Anna Witting - Jacob's oldest daughter (from his first wife Catherine), the stepdaughter of Sarah, older sister of Caleb, and older half-sister of Cassie whom she loves dearly. She leaves home to be a nurse and has a boyfriend named Justin who is serving in World War I whom she loves dearly.
 George Hearn as Dr. Hartley - the doctor who Anna works for and the father of her boyfriend Justin who is serving in World War I.
 Calen Pick as Justin Hartley - son of Dr. Hartley and boyfriend of Anna Witting whom he loves dearly. He serves in World War I but returns home safely to Anna with a broken left arm. He writes her letters all the time while he's away. Calen Pick, the actor who plays him, is the nephew of Glenn Close who plays Sarah.

References

External links
 

1999 television films
1999 films
1999 drama films
Television sequel films
Hallmark Hall of Fame episodes
Films directed by Glenn Jordan
Films based on American novels
Films based on children's books
American drama television films
1990s American films